Basim Qasim Hamdan Al-Suwaid (born 22 March 1963) is an Iraqi football manager and former player who last coached Al-Naft.

He was a defender in his playing days, also capable of playing in midfield, and he played for Iraq in the 1986 FIFA World Cup. He spent most of his playing career at Iraqi club Al-Shorta.

He has won multiple major honours as a coach, including three Iraqi Premier League titles, one Iraqi Elite Cup title, one Yemeni League title and two AFC Cup titles.

Qasim began the 2018-2019 season with leading of Al-Quwa Al-Jawiya for 27 games. Then after problems with the board, he moved to Al-Naft SC.

Managerial statistics

Honours

Player
Al-Amana
Iraq Division One: 1990–91
Iraq
Arab Nations Cup: 1985
Pan Arab Games: 1985
Iraq Police
Arab Police Championship: 1985

Manager
Al-Shorta
Iraqi Elite Cup: 2002
Al-Ahli Sana'a
Yemeni League: 2007
Duhok
Iraqi Premier League: 2009–10
Al-Zawraa
Iraqi Premier League: 2015–16
Al-Quwa Al-Jawiya
Iraqi Premier League: 2016–17
AFC Cup: 2016, 2018

References

External links
 

1963 births
Iraqi footballers
Iraq international footballers
Association football midfielders
1986 FIFA World Cup players
Living people
Al-Shorta SC players
Al-Shorta SC managers
AFC Cup winning managers
Al-Zawraa SC managers
Al-Quwa Al-Jawiya managers
Iraqi football managers
Iraqi expatriate football managers
Iraqi expatriate sportspeople in Yemen
Expatriate football managers in Yemen
Iraqi expatriate sportspeople in the United Arab Emirates
Expatriate football managers in the United Arab Emirates
Iraqi Premier League managers